St. Mary's Church is the parish church of Aldridge, a town in the Metropolitan Borough of Walsall, England. It is operated by the Church of England. The church is grade-II* listed.

Records show that it was built before 1257. Other than the 14th-century tower, all the exterior walls were added or rebuilt between the years 1841–1853. A south vestry was added in 1975. Between 1991 and 1995, the pews and choir stalls were removed.

The church has two medieval effigies, of Sir Robert de Stapleton (active  1282–1301), lord of the Manor of Great Barr and Aldridge; and of a 14th-century priest, possibly Roger de Elyngton.

The church's historic records are held at Staffordshire Record Office.

Aldridge's war memorial stands on the green next to the church.

The current Rector is the Revd Steve Doel.

A 1955 painting of the church by the then Rector, the Rev Ronald William Cartmel, is in the collection of The New Art Gallery Walsall.

References

External links 

 

Saint Mary's
Church of England church buildings in the West Midlands (county)
13th-century church buildings in England
Buildings and structures in Walsall